The 2007–08 snooker season was a series of snooker tournaments played between 16 June 2007 and 15 May 2008. This season saw the introduction of a new ranking tournament in Shanghai, while the Malta Cup lost its status as a ranking tournament.

New professional players
Countries
 
 
 
 
 
 
 
 
 
 

Note: new means in these case, that these players were not on the 2006/2007 professional Main Tour.

International champions

NGB nominations

From PIOS Tour

Calendar
The following table outlines the results and dates for all the ranking and major invitational events.

Official rankings 

The top 16 of the world rankings, these players automatically played in the final rounds of the world ranking events and were invited for the Masters.

World ranking points

Points distribution 
2007/2008 Points distribution for world ranking events:

Notes

References

External links

2007
Season 2008
Season 2007